The Call of Duty World League was a series of Call of Duty esports tournaments that began in January 2016. At its most recent form, tournaments were played on Call of Duty: Black Ops 4 for PlayStation 4. A total of US$6 million of prize money were given out for the 2019 season.

The tournament series was discontinued in favor of the franchise-based Call of Duty League, which began in early 2020.

Tournaments
The following list shows a list of all official tournaments which were a part of the Call of Duty World League.

Black Ops III

Infinite Warfare

WWII

Black Ops 4

References

World League
Sports leagues established in 2016
Activision